The 2000 South Australian Soccer Federation season was the 94th season of soccer in South Australia.

2000 SASF Premier League

The 2000 South Australian Premier League season was the top level domestic association football competition in South Australia for 2000. It was contested by 12 teams in a single 22 round league format, each team playing all of their opponents twice.

Finals

2000 SASF State League

The 2000 South Australian State League season was the second highest domestic level association football competition in South Australia. It was contested by 12 teams in a single 22 round league format, each team playing all of their opponents twice.

League table

Finals

See also
2000 SASF Premier League
2000 SASF State League
National Premier Leagues South Australia
Football Federation South Australia

References

2000 in Australian soccer
Football South Australia seasons